Wenxi railway station is a railway station in Wenxi County, Yuncheng, Shanxi, China. It is an intermediate stop on the Datong–Puzhou railway.

See also
Wenxi West railway station

References 

Railway stations in Shanxi